The New Zealand Football Championship was a men's association football league at the top of the New Zealand league system. Founded in 2004, the New Zealand Football Championship was the successor to a myriad of short-lived football leagues in the country, including the National Soccer League, the National Summer Soccer League and the New Zealand Superclub League. The league was contested by ten teams in a franchise system. For sponsorship reasons, the competition was known as the ISPS Handa Men's Premiership. From the 2021-22 season, it was replaced by the New Zealand National League.

The seasons used to run from October through to April, and consist of an eighteen-round regular season followed by a playoff series involving the four highest-placed teams, culminating in a Grand Final. Each season, two clubs would gain qualification to the OFC Champions League, the continental competition for the Oceania region. The league does not use a system of promotion and relegation.

Auckland City were the most successful side since the competition's inception, with twelve premierships and seven championship titles. A youth competition, called the National Youth League, ran parallel to the regular season from October to December – the final champions were also Auckland City, winning the final season of the competition in 2019.

Competition format 
There were two stages to the competition: the regular season, in which each team played each other twice for a total of 18 games; and the playoffs, in which the top four teams in the league play knockout matches in order to determine the champion.

Regular season 
Each team played each other team twice: once at home, and once away. Teams score three points for a win, one for a draw, and no points for a loss. At the end of the regular season, the top four teams progress to the playoffs.

For the first four seasons, the regular season had the teams play each other three times. This was changed to a home-and-away system in 2008, due to financial difficulties affecting some clubs.

Playoffs 
The playoffs consist of three matches; there were two semi-final matches, and the winners of each progress to a one-match Grand Final.

In the inaugural season, three teams took part in the playoffs. The Minor Premier (the winner of the regular season) received automatic entry to the grand final as well as hosting rights, while the second and third placed teams played a one-game preliminary final to determine entry to the grand final. The NZFC also experimented with a five team playoff in the 2005–06 season, however, this was discontinued and the league reverted to the three-team playoff system for the 2006–07 and 2007–08 seasons. The league changed to the four-team playoff system in the 2009–10 season.

Qualification to OFC Champions League 
Two teams from the NZFC qualified for the OFC Champions League each season: the team that won the regular season (the "Minor Premier") and the team that won the Grand Final (the "Champion"). If the same team wins both the Minor Premiership and the Championship, the second Champions League spot is granted to the regular season runner-up. This occurred on numerous occasions; the first instance being in 2006 when Auckland City (premiers and champions) and YoungHeart Manawatu qualified, YoungHeart Manawatu not making it to the Grand Final.

No promotion and relegation existed, making it a closed league similar to the A-League in Australia and Major League Soccer in the United States.

History

Establishment in 2004 to present
The New Zealand Football Championship was created as a replacement to the former New Zealand National Soccer League, a tournament involving clubs from the regional governing bodies of New Zealand Football. The NZFC was to be run as a summer league involving new clubs created solely for the new competition, with these new clubs being run jointly by existing winter clubs. The only exception to this was Napier City Rovers, whose summer club would be rebranded Hawke's Bay United during the second season, to be operated jointly by other clubs in the Hawke's Bay region.

Eleven groups bid for franchises, with the successful bids being announced on 7 April 2004 as Auckland City, Canterbury United, Napier City Rovers, Otago United, Team Wellington, Waikato FC, Waitakere United and YoungHeart Manawatu, with Olé Madrids, East Auckland and Team Bay of Plenty being excluded. Unhappy at their exclusion, the Olé Madrids bid team took New Zealand Soccer to court, suing for damages and demanding inclusion in the competition, claiming that, whilst they met NZ Soccer's criteria for inclusion, other successful bids did not. The case was dropped by the Madrids team eight days before the commencement of the first NZFC season. The Olé Academy, previously having had a relationship with Team Wellington, currently holds an exclusive partnership with current league side Eastern Suburbs. East Auckland also considered legal action, however this was not pursued.

The first match of the competition was on 15 October 2004, with Auckland City defeating Napier City Rovers 3–1 at Park Island, Napier. Auckland City were also crowned the inaugural NZFC champions after defeating Waitakere United 3–2 in the final.

The second season saw Napier City Rovers rebrand and reorganize their NZFC team as Hawke's Bay United, forming an amalgamated franchise with other local clubs. It also saw the first instance of a NZFC team winning the O-League, with Auckland City FC defeating Tahitian team AS Pirae 3–1.

At the conclusion of the 2006–07 season, New Zealand Football granted three-season licence extensions to seven of the eight franchises – all but YoungHeart Manawatu, who had to reapply due to concerns over the club's financial and organisational situation. However, YoungHeart eventually earned reinstatement after beating out four rival bids – one based in Gisborne, one from North Shore City, and two from Manukau. Olé Madrids also applied for the licence; however they withdrew early.

On 2 September 2010, New Zealand Football announced a five-year sponsorship agreement with ASB Bank resulting in the rebranding of the New Zealand Football Championship to the ASB Premiership.

In 2013, after a review of the competition by the ASB Premiership review committee, YoungHeart Manawatu was dropped from the competition after finishing last in the previous three seasons. New Zealand Football also confirmed that a team composed of New Zealand players born on or after 1 January 1995 would take Manawatu's place in the Premiership for at least two seasons. The addition of the team – to be known as Wanderers SC – was to provide adequate preparation for New Zealand's U-20 players for the upcoming 2015 FIFA U-20 World Cup which will be hosted by New Zealand. Much confusion surrounded the initials "SC" in the Wanderers' name, as no official explanation was given as to what they stood for. It wasn't until after their first match that coach Darren Bazeley finally revealed that "SC" stood for "Special Club", saying "it acknowledges this team has arisen out of a special situation and was specially formed for the purpose."

The 2014–15 season saw the Premiership expand to nine teams for the first time in its history. Wellington Phoenix Reserves was added to the competition to provide game time for the members of the Phoenix squad who are not playing frequently for the first team in the A-League. Restrictions were also put in place for all clubs requiring that at least 50% of match day squads are players who are eligible to play for the All Whites.

After 11 full seasons, only Auckland City and Waitakere United have been crowned Premiers or Champions, with Auckland City adding their sixth premiership and sixth title in the 2014–15 season. This trend was bucked, however, in the twelfth season of the competition, as Team Wellington defeated Auckland City 4–2 after extra time in the final. The 2018-19 saw Eastern Suburbs crowned as champions for the first time, becoming the first club to win the NZFC and the New Zealand National Soccer League.

2016 expansion
In December 2015 it was announced that the league would be expanding to 10 teams for the 2016–17 season with Eastern Suburbs from Auckland, Hamilton Wanderers from Hamilton, and Tasman United from Nelson joining the league, while WaiBop United would exit the competition.

Rebrandings

In September 2016, it was announced that the expanded league would be rebranded as the Stirling Sports Premiership.

In March 2017, it was announced that the league would be rebranded as the ISPS Handa Premiership, due to a three-year sponsorship deal with ISPS Handa.

National League Championship
In March 2021, New Zealand Football announced a change to the structure of both the premiership and the top regional leagues around the country. The four top regional leagues (NRFL Premier, Central Premier League, Mainland Premier League and the FootballSouth Premier League) would be formed into the Northern League, Central League, and the Southern League. These leagues would allow local clubs to qualify for the premiership season (now known as the National League Championship), with the top 4 teams from the Northern League, the top 3 teams from the Central League, and the top 2 teams from the Southern League making up the competition, alongside the Wellington Phoenix Reserve side. All teams that qualify plus the Phoenix Reserves, would then play a single round-robin competition between September and December.

Clubs
Until 2019, the New Zealand Football Championship had no promotion or relegation, similar to leagues in Australia and the United States. A promotion and relegation system will be introduced to the National League in 2020/2021, taking the form of a slot protection model. This model protects one National League slot for each major region of the country to protect geographic representation and maintain a pathway for all clubs into the ISPS Handa Premiership. A slot for the Wellington Phoenix's reserve side will also be protected. Promotion and relegation will be decided every 4 years.

Current clubs

Former clubs

Name changes
Napier City Rovers → Hawke's Bay United
Otago United → Southern United
Waikato FC → WaiBOP United

Champions and premiers

† Due to the COVID-19 pandemic, the 2019–20 season was concluded after 16 rounds. The remaining two rounds of the regular season and the finals series were cancelled. Auckland City, who were leading the regular season table, were declared champions and also awarded the Minor Premiership, and qualified for the 2021 OFC Champions League together with Team Wellington, who were at second place in the regular season table.

Premiership winners

Championship winners

Awards

Golden Boot
The Golden Boot is presented to the player who scores the most goals during the season.

† Due to reaching 12 goals in less games, Hamish Watson was awarded the trophy at the Grand finals.

Steve Sumner Trophy
The Steve Sumner Trophy is presented to the man of the match in the final. 

† Due to the COVID-19 pandemic, the 2019–20 season was concluded after 16 rounds and the final series wasn't played.

Team of the Decade
In 2014, to celebrate the first 10 years of the league under the franchise format (2004–05 to 2013–14), New Zealand Football announced an official Team of the Decade and five individual player awards.

Prior to the ASB Premiership Grand Final in 2014, the Team of the Decade was announced, as selected by a panel of media experts. The team was selected in a 4–3–3 formation.

Players of the Decade
Throughout the 2013–14 national league season, four Player of the Decade awards (based on playing position) were announced and prior to the 2014 Grand Final an overall Player of the Decade was announced. These awards were decided by a panel of media experts with input from fans via a public vote.

Records and statistics

 Regular season matches
Updated 2 December 2018

¹ Includes record as Napier City Rovers
² Includes record as Otago United
³ Includes record as Waikato FC

 Finals matches
As of the conclusion of the 2016–17 season

¹ Includes record as Napier City Rovers
² Includes record as Otago United
³ Includes record as Waikato FC

 Largest victories

 Highest scoring matches

Related competitions

OFC Champions League

The OFC Champions League, also known as the O-League, is the premier football competition in Oceania. It is organized by the OFC, Oceania's football governing body. It has been organized since 2007 under the current format, following its successor, the Oceania Club Championship. Two teams from the ISPS Handa Premiership participate annually. Four O-League titles have been won by teams from New Zealand.

ASB Charity Cup

The ASB Charity Cup was introduced in 2011 as a season opener played the weekend before the first matches of the ASB Premiership season. The fixture pits the ASB Premiership Grand Final winner against the best performing New Zealand team in the OFC Champions League. However, when the same team fills both categories as Auckland City did in 2014 and 2015 the ASB Premiership runner-up qualifies for Charity Cup.

 ASB Phoenix Challenge

The 2010–11 season saw the introduction of the ASB Challenge Series. This was an individual friendly competition in which the eight Premiership teams competed against a reserve team attached to Wellington Phoenix, a New Zealand-based team playing in the Australian A-League. The ASB Phoenix Challenge was discontinued after the 2010–11 season but reinstated for 2012–2013, its last appearance.

 White Ribbon Cup

The White Ribbon Cup, is a knockout cup competition run by New Zealand Football. The 2011–12 season will be the inaugural season of the NZF Cup.

It was established in 2011 to provide regular football for the six clubs not participating in the Oceania Champions League and runs in conjunction with the ISPS Handa Premiership regular season.

National Youth League

New Zealand Football additionally ran the National Youth League, a competition for the youth teams for each of the clubs in the New Zealand Football Championship. It was held between October and December, and consisted of each team playing each other once; the fixture list mirroring that of the senior league. The team with the most points at the end of the season became the champions. The final champions were the youth team of Auckland City. After a review by New Zealand Football of all their national competitions, it was decided to end the national youth competition with its last season being 2019. In the last season of the competition, Auckland City won its seventh title as well as winning three in a row from 2017 to 2019 to finish as champions of the competition.

See also
 Football in New Zealand
 New Zealand National Soccer League
 National Women's League
 Chatham Cup
 Kate Sheppard Cup
 Auckland Derby

References

External links
 ISPS Handa Premiership official website
 NZ Football official website
 RSSSF.com – New Zealand – List of Champions

 
New Zealand
1
Summer association football leagues
National championships in New Zealand
Sports leagues established in 2004
2004 establishments in New Zealand
Professional sports leagues in New Zealand
Sports leagues disestablished in 2021
2021 disestablishments in New Zealand